Iron Horse (also known as Pegasus Without Wings) is a 2-ton, 12-foot-tall iron sculpture created by Abbott Pattison. Although the sculpture was not well-received at first, as of the second decade of the twenty-first century it is visited by many tourists and University of Georgia students.

History
On May 25, 1954, Abbott Pattison, then a sculptor in residence at the University of Georgia, produced the sculpture while at the University and initially placed it there outside Reed Hall. However, after the sculpture was vandalized by disgruntled students, the sculpture was secretly moved to a barn. It remained there before horticulture professor L.C. Curtis moved it to his farm near Watkinsville, Georgia in 1959. In an interview with The New York Times in 1979, Curtis claimed that he wanted the sculpture from Lamar Dodd, the chairman of the art department at the time, because "I collect conversation pieces. I'm a little bit of an eccentric." In 2011, the sculpture was vandalized once again. Afterwards, a secret group restored the horse. Later the Curtis family had the sculpture bolted to a concrete pad because periodically people would knock it over. Around 2012 the Curtis family sold approximately 650 acres of the farm to the University of Georgia, but retained a 20-foot by 20-foot section where the horse they then owned stood. Subsequently, the Curtis family offered to deed the horse and remaining 400 square feet to the University on the condition the horse stayed in place; however, the University insisted that the sculpture be returned to campus. As of January 2020 the matter had not been resolved.

Research
In 2014, the University of Georgia named the approximately 650 acre portion of the farm it purchased the  "Iron Horse Plant Sciences Farm" in honor of the sculpture. The university uses the farm for agricultural research. In February 2017, a study created at the farm was released, which consisted of the use of drones to analyze the genetic data found in crop yields.

In popular culture
The early history of the sculpture was depicted in the 1962 National Educational Television film, Pegasus Without Wings as well as the 1980 William VanDerKloot documentary, Iron Horse. The sculpture has its own TripAdvisor page.

See also
 1954 in art

References

External links

Link to the Georgia Center Film and Videotape Collection, which includes the 1962 film Pegasus Without Wings
Road Side America
Tripadvisor

1954 establishments in Georgia (U.S. state)
1954 sculptures
Animal sculptures in Georgia (U.S. state)
Tourist attractions in Athens, Georgia
Horses in art
Iron sculptures in the United States
Relocated buildings and structures in Georgia (U.S. state)
Sculptures in Georgia (U.S. state)
Tourist attractions in Oconee County, Georgia
University of Georgia
Vandalized works of art in Georgia (U.S. state)